Merlin Park University Hospital is a public hospital in Galway, Ireland. It is managed by Saolta University Health Care Group.

History
The hospital, which was commissioned as a tuberculosis sanitarium, was designed by Norman White. It was built on the site of Merlin Park House, a late Georgian property, and opened in 1953. In October 2018, it was reported that a 200-bed elective-only facility would be built at the hospital.

Notes

Hospital buildings completed in 1953
1953 establishments in Ireland
Hospitals established in 1953
Hospitals in County Galway
Health Service Executive hospitals